Narrabeen Sports High School (abbreviated as NSHS) is a government-funded co-educational comprehensive and specialist secondary day school, with speciality in sports, located on Namona Street and Pittwater Road, in North Narrabeen, in the northern beaches region of Sydney, New South Wales, Australia.

Established as Narrabeen Girls' High School and in 1959 as Narrabeen Boys' High School, the schools merged in 1976 to form Narrabeen High School; and then, in 2000, became the first specialist sports high school in New South Wales as Narrabeen Sports High School. The school caters for approximately 850 students from Year 7 to Year 12. The school is operated by the New South Wales Department of Education; the principal is Heidi Currie.

Narrabeen Sports High School is a member of the NSW Sports High Schools Association.

History
Narrabeen Sports High School began with the establishment of Narrabeen Girls' High School in North Narrabeen, which was opened on 2 February 1954. In 1959, Narrabeen Boys' High School, located adjacent to the girls school, was established. The official opening of Narrabeen Boys was conducted in October 1962 by Robert Askin, then the Leader of the NSW Opposition and the Member for Collaroy.

There was a fire in the girls' assembly hall in the early 1970s as well as fires in the boys' school. Following damage to the boys' school in the early 1970s, it was decided to merge the boys' and girls' schools to form a new co-educational high school for the area. This was one of many reasons to amalgamate the schools. Cromer High School was also being built and the numbers at the school would halve. The Government of New South Wales decided against the amalgamation and it was only due to a strike by students and parents that the schools were merged and upgraded. The merger had always been planned, both schools were supposedly temporary with a few permanent buildings built in the 1960s and 1970s. These buildings still stand as of 2019. Thus, the schools merged in 1976 to form Narrabeen High School and most of the school buildings date from this time.

The altered badge of Narrabeen Boys' was adopted, although the motto was also changed to read "Purpose and Integrity". By the 1990s, the school had generated a reputation for sporting excellence and the decision was made to re-form the school into the state's first specialist sports high school, which was done by the end of 2000. In 2008, Narrabeen Sports High became a member of the Peninsula Community of Schools group. As of 2022, the principal is Heidi Currie.

Sports offered and facilities 
The Narrabeen Sports High School operates a talented sports development program across the following sports: athletics, Australian rules football, basketball, baseball, boxing, cricket, dance, golf, netball, rugby league, rugby union, soccer (affiliated with the Sydney FC), swimming, squash, tennis, touch football, triathlon, and wrestling.

Located between Narrabeen Beach and Narrabeen Lakes and surrounded by playing fields, the Narrabeen Sports High School is able to access the adjacent facilities of the Sydney Academy of Sport. The school's sporting facilities include a full-sized gymnasium, fitness laboratory, dance studio, tennis courts, and a hall for public performances.

Notable alumni

Narrabeen High/Sports High
 Cherie Burtonformer politician who represented Kogarah
 Pek Cowanrugby union player
 Laura Eneversurfer; competed in the World Surf League
 Daniel Gartnerrugby league player
 Mark Gerrardrugby union player
 Jim Longleyformer politician who represented Pittwater
 Baz LuhrmannAustralian film director, screenwriter, and producer
 Steve Menziesrugby league player
 Scott Millerswimmer; represented Australia at the 1996 Summer Olympics
 Chris Paynesoccer player in the A-League
 Craig PearceAustralian actor and writer
 Sebastian Ryallsoccer player in the A-League
 Josh Valentinerugby union player
 Rodney van Buizenbaseball player; represented Australia at the 2004 Summer Olympics
 Rouben Vesmadianbasketball player
 Anthony Watmoughrugby league player

Narrabeen Boys High
 John Alexander former tennis player; member of the Australian Davis Cup team; politician who represents Bennelong
 Mark Andersonswimmer; represented Australia at the 1968 Summer Olympics
 Simon Andersonsurfer; creator of the "thruster" surfboard design
 Russel Gartnerrugby league player
 John Gibbsrugby league player and media personality
 Peter Montgomery former water polo player who represented Australia at the 1972 Munich, 1976 Montreal, 1980 Moscow, and 1984 Los Angeles Summer Olympics; sports administrator who served as the Vice President of the Australian Olympic Committee since 2001; lawyer
 Doug Parkinsonsinger, actor, entertainer
 Phillip Smilesformer politician who represented Mosman and North Shore
 Nat Youngsurfer; 1966 & 1970 World Surfing Champion; 1966, 1967 & 1969 Australian Surfing Champion; author

Narrabeen Girls High
 Marlena JefferySpouse of a former Governor-General of Australia, Michael Jeffery
 Jenny Turrallswimmer; represented Australia at the 1976 Olympics; Commonwealth Games; and former world record holder

See also 

 List of government schools in New South Wales
 Selective school (New South Wales)
 Education in Australia

References

External links 
 
 Badge of Narrabeen Boys' High - held by the Powerhouse Museum

Public high schools in Sydney
Selective schools in New South Wales
Educational institutions established in 1954
1954 establishments in Australia
Sports schools in Australia
Northern Beaches